Boscombe may refer to:

Boscombe, Dorset, a suburb of Bournemouth, England
Boscombe railway station, its former railway station
A.F.C. Bournemouth, an association football team sometimes called Boscombe Football Club
Boscombe, Wiltshire, England
MoD Boscombe Down, a military airfield near Boscombe in Wiltshire
Boscombe Bowmen, a Bronze Age burial group found at Boscombe Down
Boscombe, Alberta, Canada